Muž v povětří is a 1956 Czechoslovak comedy film, directed by Miroslav Cikán. It stars  Vlasta Burian, Milka Balek-Brodská, and Z. Chalupník.

References

External links
Muž v povětří at the Internet Movie Database

1956 films
Czechoslovak comedy films
1956 comedy films
Films directed by Miroslav Cikán
1950s Czech films
Czechoslovak black-and-white films